Seleznyovo is a rural locality (a selo) in Kiprinsky Selsoviet, Shelabolikhinsky District, Altai Krai, Russia. The population was 494 as of 2013. There are 11 streets.

Geography 
Seleznyovo is located 36 km west of Shelabolikha (the district's administrative centre) by road. Omutskoye is the nearest rural locality.

References 

Rural localities in Shelabolikhinsky District